Pieter Winsemius (born 7 March 1942) is a retired Dutch politician of the People's Party for Freedom and Democracy (VVD) and businessman.

Winsemius worked as a researcher at the Leiden University from February 1966 until October 1970 and as a management consultant at the McKinsey & Company from October 1970 until November 1982. After the election of 1982 Winsemius was appointed as Minister of Housing, Spatial Planning and the Environment in the Cabinet Lubbers I, taking office on 4 November 1982. After the election of 1986 Winsemius was not giving a ministerial post in the new cabinet. The Cabinet Lubbers I was replaced by the Cabinet Lubbers II on 14 July 1986.

Winsemius semi-retired from active politics and returned to the private sector and the public sector and occupied numerous seats as a corporate director and nonprofit director on several board of directors and supervisory boards (World Wide Fund for Nature, Vereniging Natuurmonumenten, Stichting Max Havelaar, European Centre for Nature Conservation, Stichting Pensioenfonds ABP and the Energy Research Centre) and served on several state commissions and councils on behalf of the government (Organisation for Scientific Research, National Insurance Bank, Staatsbosbeheer, Meteorological Institute and the Scientific Council for Government Policy). Winsemius also returned as a senior management consultant of the McKinsey & Company from August 1986 until October 1992 and served as a distinguished professor of Environmental management at the Tilburg University from 1 October 1999 until 1 September 2012. Winsemius was appointed again as Minister of Housing, Spatial Planning and the Environment in the caretaker Cabinet Balkenende III following the resignation of Sybilla Dekker, taking office on 26 September 2006. The Cabinet Balkenende III was replaced by the Cabinet Balkenende IV on 22 February 2007.

Following the end of his active political career, Winsemius again returned to the private sector and the public sector and resumed his previous positions (Vereniging Natuurmonumenten, Energy Research Centre, Stichting Pensioenfonds ABP and the Scientific Council for Government Policy) and as an advocate, lobbyist and activist for Conservation, Environmentalism, Sustainable development and Climate change issues.

Political career
Winsemius is the son of economist Albert Winsemius. Trained as a physics scientist, and active as partner in the business consultancy firm McKinsey, he was Minister of Housing, Spatial Planning and the Environment (VROM) in the First Lubbers cabinet, on behalf of the VVD. As a young minister, he brought environmental laws to effect, including the rules for environmental impact assessments. After his ministerial period, he became chairman of the Vereniging Natuurmonumenten.

On 22 September 2006, he again became minister of VROM, temporarily succeeding Sybilla Dekker during the Third Balkenende cabinet, until a completely new government had been formed on 22 February 2007 and he was succeeded by Jacqueline Cramer. Since 2003 until 21 November 2012, he has been member of the Scientific Council for Government Policy, for which he was awarded the grade of Commander of the Order of Orange-Nassau upon his retirement.

Winsemius has written books about management and social issues, including Speel nooit een uitwedstrijd (lit. 'never play away games') (1988), in which he compared managing to professional soccer. During the 1980s, Winsemius was co-host of the television show Aktua in bedrijf.

Academic career
Since October 1999, Winsemius holds a professorate for Management of Sustainable Development, at the Tilburg University. On 7 March 2007, he was elected as most influential sustainable Dutchman in the De Duurzame 100 investigation by the newspaper Trouw and broadcasting group LLink.

Decorations

References

External links

Official
  Prof.Dr. P. (Pieter) Winsemius Parlement & Politiek

 

 

1942 births
Living people
Commanders of the Order of Orange-Nassau
Climate activists
Dutch academic administrators
Dutch business writers
Dutch conservationists
Dutch corporate directors
Dutch education writers
Dutch natural scientists
Dutch nonprofit directors
Dutch nonprofit executives
Dutch lobbyists
Dutch management consultants
Dutch science writers
20th-century Dutch physicists
Dutch public administration scholars
Dutch publishers (people)
Environmental social scientists
Environmental writers
Hybrid electric vehicle advocates
Knights of the Order of the Netherlands Lion
Leiden University alumni
McKinsey & Company people
Members of the Royal Netherlands Academy of Arts and Sciences
Members of the Scientific Council for Government Policy
Ministers of Housing and Spatial Planning of the Netherlands
People from Voorburg
People's Party for Freedom and Democracy politicians
Sustainability advocates
Academic staff of Tilburg University
20th-century Dutch businesspeople
20th-century Dutch civil servants
20th-century Dutch educators
20th-century Dutch male writers
20th-century Dutch politicians
21st-century Dutch businesspeople
21st-century Dutch civil servants
21st-century Dutch educators
21st-century Dutch male writers
21st-century Dutch politicians